This list of tallest buildings in Johannesburg ranks all completed buildings by height in the city of Johannesburg, which is the largest city in South Africa. Johannesburg is classified as a megacity, and is one of the 100 largest urban areas in the world.

Tallest buildings

This includes spires and architectural details.

Notable buildings in Johannesburg
Johannesburg features a variety of commercial and residential buildings, so there are also a few modern buildings such as the KwaDukuza eGoli Hotel and the Trust Bank Building. The Johannesburg-Pretoria combined metropolitan area has the densest concentration of skyscrapers on the continent and one of the densest in the world.

Carlton Centre is a skyscraper and shopping centre located in downtown Johannesburg, South Africa. At 223 metres (730 ft), it is the tallest building in Africa and about half the height of the Willis Tower (the former Sears Tower) in Chicago. It was the tallest building in the southern hemisphere when originally completed. The building houses both offices and shops, and has over 46 per cent of the floor area below ground level. A viewing deck on the 50th floor offers views of Johannesburg and Pretoria.

Ponte City is a skyscraper in the Hillbrow neighborhood of Johannesburg, South Africa. It was built in 1975 to a height of 173 m (567.6 ft), making it the tallest residential skyscraper in Africa. The 54-story building is cylindrical, with an open center allowing additional light into the apartments. The center space is known as "the core" and rises above an uneven rock floor. Ponte City was an extremely desirable address for its views over all of Johannesburg and its surroundings. The sign on top of the building is the highest and largest sign in the southern hemisphere. It advertises the South African mobile phone company Vodacom.

Marble Towers is a skyscraper in the Central Business District of Johannesburg, South Africa. It was built in 1973 and is 32 storeys tall. The building has an eight-storey parking garage attached to it. It is made out of a mixture of concrete and marble. Its main use is for commercial offices.

KwaDukuza eGoli Hotel is a skyscraper in the Central Business District of Johannesburg, South Africa. The complex, built in 1970 originally as "The Tollman Towers" (owned by the prominent South African family), were two separate towers, one 40 stories and the other 22, linked by a four-story podium with a pool deck and a running track. The building was empty for many years as the hotel, The Johannesburg Sun, relocated to Sandton. The building was then converted to a Holiday Inn, which also quickly failed. The new KwaDukuza eGoli Hotel opened in 2001, when it hosted 3000 police officers for the world summit on sustainable development, it was owned Mark Whitehead of Whitehead Enterprises, then also soon went out of business. The building is "mothballed."

Sandton City is a shopping centre located in Sandton, Johannesburg that was built as pioneer centre in 1973. The tower was built as part of a business park for downtown Sandton, a suburb of Johannesburg. Liberty Properties announced in 2008 that Sandton City would receive a R1.77 billion upgrade. Liberty Properties Chief Executive Samuel Ogbo envisaged the complex as South Africa's very own Wall Street The redevelopment will include the construction of a 60-storey office tower, new retail and office space and residential apartments.

Trust Bank Building is a skyscraper in the Central Business District of Johannesburg, South Africa. The building is the former head office of Trust Bank of South Africa, and as such has one of the largest bank vaults in South Africa. The building was sold in February 2003 for Rand 6.4 million (USD $640.000), which may prompt the name to be changed to that of the new tenant.

11 Diagonal Street is a skyscraper in Johannesburg, South Africa. It is designed to look like a diamond as it reflects different views of the Central Business District from each angle of the building.

Skyscrapers number by cities
This table shows South African cities with at least one skyscraper over 100 metres in height, completed.

References

Tallest, Johannesburg
Buildings and structures in Johannesburg